Fakahiku is an uninhabited island in Lulunga district, in the Ha'apai islands of Tonga. It is part of the ʻOʻua fisheries Special Management Area.

References

Islands of Tonga
Haʻapai